Justice Madan Bhimarao Lokur (born 31 December 1953) is an Indian jurist. He is a Judge of Supreme Court of Fiji. He is former Judge of Supreme Court of India. He is also former Chief Justice of Andhra Pradesh High Court and Gauhati High Court and Judge of Delhi High Court.

Education 
Lokur was educated at the Modern School, New Delhi. He later attended St. Joseph's College, Allahabad for his ISC examinations. For his university studies, Lokur graduated in history from St. Stephen's College, Delhi University with Honours. He obtained his law degree from Faculty of Law, University of Delhi.

Judgeship
Lokur was elevated to the Bench on 19 February 1999. He joined Delhi High Court as an Additional Judge. He was appointed a Permanent Judge of that High Court on 5 July 1999.

He also functioned as the Acting Chief Justice of the Delhi High Court from 13 February 2010 to 21 May 2010 before being transferred as the Chief Justice of Gauhati High Court from 24 June 2010 to 14 November 2011 and High Court of Judicature at Hyderabad from 15 November 2011 to 3 June 2012.

He was elevated as Judge of the Supreme Court on 4 June 2012. He retired as senior most judge of Supreme Court on 30 December 2018. He is now a judge of the non-resident panel of the Supreme court of Fiji, and by far the first Indian judge to become a judge of a foreign country.

Notable judgements and decisions

Minority sub-quota 

In May 2012, Andhra Pradesh High Court Divisional Bench consisting of Chief Justice Madan Lokur and Justice PV Sanjay Kumar struck down Govt of India's decision to allocate 4.5% sub-quota (within the 27% Other Backward Classes quota) for minorities. The bench held that the sub-quota was based on religion and not on any other intelligible consideration. The court criticised the decision by saying, "In fact, we must express our anguish at the rather casual manner in which the entire issue has been taken up by the central government."

Illegal mining scam 

As the Chief Justice of Andhra Pradesh High Court, Justice Lokur suspended Special CBI Judge T Pattabhirama Rao and ordered his prosecution in a Mining scam case relating to the Reddy brothers. The complaint against the judge was that he granted bail to G. Janardhana Reddy after receiving a bribe.

References 

1953 births
Living people
Justices of the Supreme Court of India
Scholars from Allahabad
Judges of the Delhi High Court
Senior Advocates in India
Chief Justices of the Andhra Pradesh High Court
Chief Justices of the Gauhati High Court
20th-century Indian judges
21st-century Indian judges
St. Stephen's College, Delhi alumni
Faculty of Law, University of Delhi alumni
Modern School (New Delhi) alumni